Whiteson railway station or Whites railway station or White's Junction is a railway station in Whiteson, Oregon, where the Dayton, Sheridan and Grande Ronde Railroad crossed the west side line of the Oregon and California Railroad.

Location 

Operation 
The  narrow gauge line was converted to standard gauge in 1891. By 1905 the line between Whiteson and Dayton was abandoned. Since then the former diamond crossing has been replaced by a wye junction only, which is still in use.

External links 
 Brian McCamish: The History of Railroads in Yamhill County, Oregon.

References 

Railway stations in Oregon
Year of establishment missing
Former railway stations in Oregon
1905 disestablishments in Oregon